"Why Won't You Give Me Your Love?" was the first single to be released from the Zutons' second album, Tired of Hanging Around (2006). It was released on 3 April 2006 and became the band's first UK top-10 entry, peaking at number nine on the UK Singles Chart.

Track listings
CD version 1
 "Why Won't You Give Me Your Love?"
 "I Want You"

CD version 2
 "Why Won't You Give Me Your Love?"
 "Are We Friends or Lovers?"
 "What's My Heart For?"
 "Why Won't You Give Me Your Love?" (Video)

7-inch vinyl
 "Why Won't You Give Me Your Love?"
 "Love's Little Lies"

References

The Zutons songs
2006 singles
2006 songs
Deltasonic singles
Songs written by Dave McCabe